Tōkidenshō Angel Eyes (闘姫伝承 ANGEL EYES) is a Japanese fighting video game developed and published by Tecmo. It was released in arcades in June 1996, and later to the PlayStation console in December 1997. It is a two-dimensional fighting game featuring all female cast of characters.

Gameplay 

Tōkidenshō Angel Eyes is a two-dimensional fighting game, featuring an all female cast. The original arcade game features eight playable characters with a wide array of character designs. Characters in the game include a biker girl, a volleyball player, a girl in a Japanese school uniform, a ninja girl, and one who uses a stuffed teddy bear to fight.

Attacks include standard punches and kicks as seen in many fighting games, but also includes special moves, and special techniques. Unique to the game however, is a system called  "reverse combo correction" by fans and one of the planners who is inexperienced in fighting games. In a typical fighting game, as combo attacks are chained together, the damage decreases. However, in this game, the damage actually increases as the combo is chained. This results in each characters being able to carry out combos that instantly kill the opponent. Another feature is "homing jumps", which are special jumps which thrust you into your opponent. Game modes in the PlayStation port include "Arcade mode", "VS mode", "training mode", and "story mode".

Development and release 
Development began in 1994 after Ninja Gaiden II on the Neo Geo was cancelled. Tōkidenshō Angel Eyes was one of the first games to feature all female characters in a fighting game. Similar games from that era include games such as Pretty Fighter X, Asuka 120% Burning Fest, and Variable Geo. Some of the characters in the game were created via pixel art, while some of them were created from pre-rendered 3D models. The PlayStation version has 2D renditions of Kiriko, Reika and Lina as unlockable characters.

Tōkidenshō Angel Eyes was originally released in Japanese arcades in June 1996. Later it was ported to the Sony PlayStation console and released on December 11, 1997. Also released was a Drama CD titled Tōkidenshō Drama Album, as well as a soundtrack CD. On November 12, 2008, the PlayStation version of the game was re-released for the PlayStation Network's Game Archives, and was available to download for the PlayStation Portable and PlayStation 3. On October 20, 2022 Tōkidenshō Angel Eyes joined Hamster Corporation's Arcade Archives series on PlayStation 4 and Nintendo Switch

Reception 

Famitsu gave the game a score of 22 out of 40. Reviewers noted the unique nature of mixing pixel art and polygon characters, but noted it wasn't a major issue. They noted that it follows a trend of recent fighting games to include battles in the air, and noted they were fun but somewhat awkward.

References

External links
Tōkidenshō Angel Eyes at the Killer List of Videogames
Tōkidenshō Angel Eyes at MobyGames

1996 video games
Arcade video games
Bishōjo games
Japan-exclusive video games
PlayStation (console) games
PlayStation 3 games
PlayStation Network games
Tecmo games
Fighting games
Video games developed in Japan
Video games featuring female protagonists
Video games set in Japan